MCU refers to the Marvel Cinematic Universe, a shared universe of superhero films and TV series developed by Marvel Studios.

MCU may also refer to:

Arts and entertainment
 MCU, Japanese hip-hop/rap artist, formerly of Kick the Can Crew
 Medium close-up, camera direction used in British television scripts
 Major Crimes Unit, in various works of fiction:
 A part of the Gotham City Police Department in the Batman comics
 An agency of the Chicago Police Department in the TV series Crime Story

Science and technology

Computing
 Microcontroller unit, a single computer chip designed for embedded applications
 Media Control Unit, a touchscreen interface in the Tesla Model S car
 Memory controller unit, the part of a microprocessor responsible for interfacing it with main memory
 Minimum coded unit, the pixel block size of a JPEG computer image
 Modular Concept Unit, the basic avionics packaging compliant with ARINC Specification 600
 Monte Carlo Universal, a computer software project to simulate particle transport using the Monte Carlo method
 Multi-chip unit, a system that contains the processing units of the VAX 9000 minicomputer
 Multipoint control unit, a device used to bridge videoconferencing connections

Other uses in science and technology
 Milk clotting units, a measure of enzyme activity
 Mitochondrial Calcium Uniporter, a calcium channel in a human cell's mitochondria
 Moisture cure polyurethane coatings, corrosion-resistant marine and protective coatings

Organizations

Universities
Marine Corps University, U.S. Marine Corps military graduate school
Ming Chuan University, Taipei, Taiwan
Manila Central University, Caloocan, Philippines
Marymount California University, Palos Verdes, CA, USA
Mahachulalongkornrajavidyalaya University, a Buddhist university in Thailand with many monastics involved

Other organizations
 Movement of Unitarian Communists (Movimento dei Comunisti Unitari), an Italian communist party
 Modern Churchpeople's Union, an Anglican liberal theological organisation
 Municipal Credit Union, in New York City
 Marine Credit Union, in La Crosse, Wisconsin

Other uses
 Montluçon – Guéret Airport, France (IATA airport code MCU)